Ferdino Francio Hernandez (born 25 May 1971) is a Netherlands Antilles former footballer.

Hernandez was born in Amersfoort. He made over 100 appearances in the Eredivisie before moving to England in 2000. After trials with Barnsley, Hearts and Dunfermline Athletic, he signed a three-month contract with Wigan Athletic in November 2000. His only appearance for the club came in a 3–1 win against Dorchester Town in the FA Cup before leaving the club by mutual consent in December 2000.

Hernandez played at international level four times for Netherlands Antilles.

References

External links

1971 births
Living people
FC Utrecht players
AZ Alkmaar players
Eredivisie players
Wigan Athletic F.C. players
Dutch Antillean footballers
Dutch Antillean expatriate footballers
Netherlands Antilles international footballers
Expatriate footballers in England
Hapoel Kfar Saba F.C. players
Expatriate footballers in Israel
Curaçao footballers
Sportspeople from Amersfoort
Association football midfielders
Footballers from Utrecht (province)
Dutch expatriate sportspeople in Israel
Dutch expatriate sportspeople in England